Magnus Martinelle (born 8 February 1973) is a former tennis player from Sweden.

Tennis career

Juniors

Martinelle was once Sweden's No. 1 junior player, and he was the runner-up at the 1991 Salk Open after losing the final to Alex Rădulescu in two sets.

Partnering with countryman Thomas Enqvist, Martinelle won the boys' doubles event at the 1991 French Open.

Pro tour
In the ATP Tour, Martinelle did not enter any main draw. He lost in the singles qualifying rounds at the 1991 Stockholm Open.

References

External links
 
 

1973 births
Living people
Swedish male tennis players
French Open junior champions
Grand Slam (tennis) champions in boys' doubles